Jefferson E. Peyser (November 14, 1899 - December 30, 1989) served in the California State Assembly for the 27th district from 1935 to 1939. During World War I he served in the United States Army.  He was a member of the San Francisco Board of Supervisors.

References

United States Army personnel of World War I
San Francisco Board of Supervisors members
Republican Party members of the California State Assembly
1899 births
1989 deaths